Turkey took part in the Eurovision Song Contest 1997. The country was represented by Şebnem Paker and Grup Etnic with the song "Dinle" written by Mehtap Altıntemiz and composed by Levent Çoker. Both Şebnem Paker and Levent Çoker had represented Turkey in the contest of the preceding year.

Before Eurovision

20. Eurovision Şarkı Yarışması Türkiye Finali 
The final took place on 1 March 1997 at the TRT Studios in Ankara, hosted by Bülent Özveren and Meltem Ersan. Ten songs competed and the winner was determined by an expert jury. Songs #1,3,4,5 and 8 were performed by the use of backing tracks however they were still backed by the orchestra with their respective conductors. Songs #6,9 and 10 played live while songs #2 and 7 used full playback. Ümit Eroğlu was the chief conductor in this preselection. His orchestra consisted of 49 musicians.

At Eurovision
Heading into the final of the contest, RTÉ reported that bookmakers ranked the entry 25th (last) out of the 25 entries. On the night of the contest Şebnem performed 2nd in the running order, following Cyprus and preceding Norway. At the close of the voting, Dinle had received 121 points placing Turkey 3rd. This was the best result Turkey had ever reached at the contest up to that time, and will remain so until their victory in 2003. 18 participants voted for Dinle. The Turkish jury awarded its 12 points to Malta.

Voting

References

1997
Countries in the Eurovision Song Contest 1997
Eurovision